Scatarie Bank is a bank on the continental shelf off the northeast coast of Nova Scotia, Canada. It represents the remains of a volcanic centre that was constructed along a fracture zone during the Cretaceous period.

References

External links

Undersea banks of the Atlantic Ocean
Cretaceous volcanoes
Volcanoes of Nova Scotia
Cretaceous Nova Scotia